The Darlington Arena is a rugby union stadium, located in Darlington, County Durham.

The arena was opened in the summer of 2003, as the new home ground of Darlington F.C., following the decision to leave their previous ground, Feethams, after the 2002–03 season. With a seating capacity of 25,000, the arena rarely attracted large crowds, with the usual attendance being around 2,000. The cost of the arena caused the club to go into administration three times. Eventually, the club decided to leave the arena after nine years following the 2011–12 season.

In December 2012, after rumours that the arena could be closed down and be replaced with different reported purposes, rugby union team, Darlington Mowden Park RFC purchased the arena for £2 million; the owner of the club later stated that he believed that the arena could lead to much more success for the club.

History
Prior to moving to the ground in 2003, Darlington F.C. had been playing at Feethams, located near to the town centre. The current stadium was built on a greenfield site next to Darlington's A66 bypass. Upon completion the arena was originally called the Reynolds Arena, after the club's then owner, George Reynolds. After Reynolds' bankruptcy and arrest on charges of money laundering, the name was changed to the New Stadium in April 2004.

The Arena consists of four equally sided stands. The West Stand, located behind the goal, was generally the more vocal of the two sides used by home supporters.

A crowd of 11,600 watched the first game in the new stadium for a 2–0 defeat to Kidderminster Harriers. Since then, the ground averaged a gate of around 1,500 to 2,000 supporters, although certain fixtures such as the derby match defeat against local rivals Hartlepool United in March 2007 (9,987 spectators), pulled in a significantly larger turnout.

The club has sold the naming rights for the stadium to various sponsors: Williamson Motors, 96.6 TFM, Balfour Webnet, and in 2009 The Northern Echo; since Darlington Mowden Park RFC have used the arena, it has been named The Northern Echo Arena, rather than the previous name The Northern Echo Darlington Arena.

It was the largest Conference National venue with a capacity of 25,000. Attendances for football matches were restricted to 10,000 by local planning regulations, because of poor access roads around the stadium, although the club was allowed to apply for an exception for special occasions.

It was announced in May 2012 that Darlington would no longer play at the Darlington Arena. The club initially agreed a ground share deal with Shildon A.F.C., before deciding to share with Bishop Auckland F.C. instead.

Following the announcement that the football club would no longer play at the arena, it was reported that the arena may be closed down and be replaced by a housing estate. This would be proved to be true, as they were promoted to National League 1, the third tier of English rugby union, beginning in the 2014–15 season.

The club played their first game at the arena on 2 February 2013, in front of a crowd of over 1,000 spectators, defeating Bromsgrove 62–7 in a National League 2 North league game. Regular attendances would bring in around 700–1,300 spectators.

Other uses
The Arena also played host to the first professional rugby league match to be played in County Durham, when Gateshead Thunder used the ground for their fifth round 2009 Challenge Cup game against Oldham due to a fixture clash.

Concerts
Darlington planned to use the stadium for musical concerts to increase club revenue. Elton John was the first act to play at the stadium, on 5 July 2008, attracting a crowd of 17,000.

In 2018 Steps and A-ha performed at the arena, followed in 2019 by Jess Glynne.

Vaccinations

During the COVID-19 pandemic, the arena was used as a large vaccination centre. It was able to vaccinate up to 7,700 people per week.

References

External links
 The Darlington Arena at Football Ground Map

Defunct football venues in England
Rugby union stadiums in England
Darlington F.C.
Sports venues in County Durham
Sport in the Borough of Darlington
Sports venues completed in 2003
English Football League venues
Buildings and structures in Darlington